A list of animated television series first aired in 1987.

Anime television series first aired in 1987

See also
 List of animated feature films of 1987
 List of Japanese animation television series of 1987

References

Television series
Animated series
1987
1987
1987-related lists